Marius Meremans (born 20 May 1967 in Dendermonde) is a Belgian politician for the N-VA party.

Meremans studied for a diploma in languages and worked as a school teacher in Dendermonde. He was a member of the former Volksunie (VU) party and was a councilor in Dendermonde for the VU from 1995 to 1997. He later joined the N-VA faction of the party after the VU was dissolved. In 2013, he became a member of the Flemish Parliament following the resignation of Lieven Dehandschutter. He was re-elected in 2014 and 2019. In the Flemish parliament, he serves on the Committees for Culture, Heritage and Spatial Planning.

References

1967 births
Living people
Members of the Flemish Parliament
New Flemish Alliance politicians
21st-century Belgian politicians
People from Dendermonde